The Shire of Harvey is a local government area of Western Australia.  Harvey is located in the state's South West region, approximately 140 km south of Perth, and includes some of Bunbury's northern suburbs. The shire covers an area of 1,728 km² and had a population of approximately 26,500 as at the 2016 Census. Around 12% of the population are of Southern or Eastern European origin.

It contains three large towns, Harvey, Australind and Brunswick Junction and a number of smaller towns. The shire office is located on Uduc Road, Harvey, and an administration centre is open at Mulgara Street, Australind.

History

It was established as the Brunswick Road District on 14 December 1894, when it separated from the larger Wellington Road District. The first election was held on 11 February 1895.

It was renamed the Harvey Road District on 10 December 1909. It was made a shire with effect from 1 July 1961 following the passage of the Local Government Act 1960, which reformed all remaining road districts into shires.

Wards
The shire does not have Wards, although is represented by Councillors from all around the Shire.

The Shire President is Paul Gillett.

Towns and localities
The towns and localities of the Shire of Harvey with population and size figures based on the most recent Australian census:

Population

The ABS provides a breakdown for the Australind suburban area (Part A) and the remainder of the Shire (Part B):

Heritage-listed places

As of 2023, 282 places are heritage-listed in the Shire of Harvey, of which nine are on the State Register of Heritage Places, among them the Yarloop Workshops which were destroyed in a 2016 bush fire.

See also
Camp Doogs

References

External links
 

 
Harvey